Khan Daan (family), also spelled as Khandaan, is a 1942 Bollywood film directed by Shaukat Hussain Rizvi and produced by D.M. Pancholi, starring Pran, Noor Jehan, Ghulam Mohammed and M. Ajmal.

It was written by author Imtiaz Ali Taj and made in Pancholi's Lahore studio. For the first time in British India, there was a lot of "ahead of film release" publicity for this film. As a result, this became a much-awaited film for the Indian public and became a hit film when released.

Plot
A very preachy movie about the 'dangers' of rich men getting ensnared by women of "loose" morals. A rich man is seduced by a gold-digging woman. When she later betrays him, the man kills her along with her new lover. He is arrested and sent to jail for a long time. When he is released, he finds employment as a gardener and becomes a father-figure to his employer's son Anwar and to Anwar's fiancée Zeenat (Noor Jehan). When he sees the young Anwar falling into the same kind of trap he had all those years ago he does his best to prevent the tragedy of his own life from being repeated in Anwar's. Future film directors Ramesh Saigal and S. K. Ojha assisted in this film.

Cast
 Noor Jehan as Zeenat
 Manorama as Nargis
 Moolchand as riding bicycles  behind  Noor Jehen's car
 Ghulam Mohammed as Amjad
 Pran Krisnan as Anwar
 M. Ajmal as Iqbal
 Ibrahim (Heengwala) as Akbar
 Durga Mota as Augustus
 Baby Akhtar as Najma
 Nafees Begum as Mother
 G. N. Butt as Ramsaran
 M. Channi as Nisar

Music 
The music was composed by Ghulam Haider and the lyrics by M. D. Taseer, Nazim Panipati and D. N. Madhok. The playback singers include Noor Jehan, Shamshad Begum, Ghulam Haider and Nasim Akhtar. This film was a landmark movie for Ghulam Haider and Noor Jehan as well as the film director Shaukat Hussain Rizvi. All 3 ended up becoming well-sought-after persons, when this film became a mega-hit musical movie.

1. "Mere Liye Jahan Mein Chaen Hai Naa Qaraar Hai" - Noor Jehan
 
2. "Tu Kaunsi Badli Mein Mere Chand Hai Aaja" - Noor Jehan
 
3. "Khelenge Hum Aankh Macholi" - Noor Jehan
 
4. "Mere Baagh Ka Mali Phir Aagaya" - Shamshad Begum
 
5. "Maar Gayi Re Hamein Teri Nazaria" - Noor Jehan
 
6. "Udja Udja Panchhi Udja" - Noor Jehan & Ghulam Haider
 
7. "Chalo Paniya Bharan Ko Chalein" – Shamshad Begum & Nasim Akhtar 
 
8. "Mere Mann Ka Panchhi Kyun Bole" – Noor Jehan

9. "Meri Ammi Ka Raj Bhala" - Shamshad Begum

References

External links
 
 Khandan (1942) on indiancine.ma
 Ghulam Haider profile on hindilyrics.net website

1942 films
1940s Hindi-language films
Indian black-and-white films